Catoosa Springs is an unincorporated community in Catoosa County, in the U.S. state of Georgia.

History
Catoosa Springs had its start in the 1840s as a destination mineral spa. A post office was established at Catoosa Springs in 1853, and remained in operation until it was discontinued in 1896.

References

Unincorporated communities in Catoosa County, Georgia
Unincorporated communities in Georgia (U.S. state)